Raden Pandji Chandra Pratomo Samiadji Massaid (August 7, 1967 – February 5, 2011), also known as Adjie Massaid, was an Indonesian actor, model, and politician. He was a member of the House of Representatives (Dewan Perwakilan Rakyat) in 2004–2009 and 2009–2014 from the Democratic Party.

Early life and career 
Adjie Massaid was born in Jakarta, the second of the four children of Raden Pandji Sujono Tjondro Adiningrat and Joyce Broers. He was of Javanese-Madurese-Dutch descent. Adjie spent his childhood in Rawamangun, East Jakarta. In 1975, when he was in the 4th grade of elementary school, he and his family moved to the Netherlands. During his adolescence, he joined Ajax Amsterdam Juniors.

Adjie started his career as a catwalk model. His first screen appearance was in Garin Nugroho's 1991 film Cinta Dalam Sepotong Roti (Love In a Piece of Bread).

Political career 
Adjie began his career in politics by joining the Democratic Party, led by Susilo Bambang Yudhoyono, in 2004. With the Democrat Party victory in 2004 election, Adjie was chosen to be the member of the House of Representatives (DPR) for the Democratic Party. In the second period of Yudhoyono's government, he was chosen for the second time as a member of Komisi V DPR 2009–2014. Besides being active as a politician, Adjie was also the U–23 national pre-Olympics soccer team manager.

Personal life
Adjie married the singer Reza Artamevia on 9 February 1999. From this marriage, they had 2 children, named Zahwa and Aaliyah. They divorced on 17 January 2005, Adjie regained custody of his two children. Adjie built a relationship with Angelina Sondakh and they got married on 29 April 2009. They had one child named Keanu Dluha Jabaar Massaid, born on 9 September 2009.

Both girls now are living with their mothers.

Adjie Massaid died in Jakarta on Friday, 5 February 2011, at around 12 am. He is buried at Jeruk Purut Cemetery in South Jakarta

Filmography 
 "Cinta Dalam Sepotong Roti" (1990)
 "Rini Tomboy" (1991)
 "Asmara" (1992)
 "Pengantin Cinta" (2010)

Soap opera 
 "Buku Harian I"
 "Buku Harian II"
 "Buku Harian III"
 "Janji Hati"
 "Merah Hitam Cinta"
 "Mahligai Diatas Pasir"

References 

1967 births
2011 deaths
Indonesian male actors
Indonesian politicians
People from Jakarta
Indo people
Indonesian people of Dutch descent
People from Madura Island
Madurese people
Javanese people